ANCAP (Administración Nacional de Combustibles, Alcoholes y Portland, English: "National Administration of Fuels, Alcohols and Portland") is a state-owned company in Uruguay. It is involved in the production of petroleum products, Portland cement and alcoholic beverages. ANCAP has a long-term corporate credit rating "BB-" with positive outlook by Standard & Poor's.

In December 2008, ANCAP launched Uruguay's first offshore licensing round, due for completion June 2009.

In addition to Uruguay, ANCAP operates in Argentina where it owns Petrolera del Cono Sur, operating a petrol station network.

In 2017, ANCAP and UTE opened an electric vehicle network connecting Colonia del Sacramento, Rosario, Puntas de Valdez, Montevideo, San Luis and Punta del Este, with stations every 65 km. The stations at the Carrasco International Airport and Colonia have 43 kW, whereas the other stations have 22 kW.

History 
The National Administration of Fuels, Alcohols and Portland (ANCAP) was created by Law No. 8,764, on October 15, 1931 during the administration of Gabriel Terra. With its creation, the state monopoly on the import and refining of crude oil was established, as well as on the import and manufacture of alcohol and distilled alcoholic beverages. In addition, the installation of portland factories and related products was approved, to increase the performance of public works to, in turn, reduce unemployment caused by the crash of 1929.

In the 1930s, the company built its first oil facilities to serve as a distributor, as well as the La Teja Refinery that, with a refining capacity of 600 m³ per day, led to the cessation of imports of manufactured products. It also entered a market for refined liquid fuels, through the import and sale of products throughout the country, and the first two filling stations were installed in Montevideo. In the 1940s, due to the increase in the activity of the Uruguayan economy and the need to ensure the energy supply, the company acquired oil tankers, carried out technical reforms to increase the processing capacity of the Refinery and began negotiations to modify the agreement with private oil companies, for the supply of crude oil and for the profits guaranteed to multinational companies, for the commercialization of diesel oil, diesel oil and fuel oil.

In the 1990s, the commercialization in the country of products intended for the public began to be carried out in filling stations with the ANCAP seal under concessions to private companies such as branches.

Headquarters 
ANCAP's main offices are housed in the building located at the intersection of Paysandú Street and Libertador Avenue. It was designed by the architect Rafael Lorente Escudero —who also designed filling stations in both Carrasco and Punta del Este— and inaugurated in 1948.

See also 
Petroleum in Uruguay
Raúl Fernando Sendic Rodríguez#ANCAP stewardship

References

External links 

 Official website

 

Government-owned companies of Uruguay
Oil and gas companies of Uruguay
Centro, Montevideo
Economy of Montevideo
Companies based in Montevideo
Uruguay
Conglomerate companies established in 1931
Energy companies established in 1931
Non-renewable resource companies established in 1931
1931 establishments in Uruguay